Carl Emil Hutchings (born 24 September 1974) is an English retired professional footballer who played as a utility player. He is best remembered for his five years in the Football League with Brentford, for whom he made over 200 appearances. He also played league football for Bristol City, Southend United and Exeter City. Hutchings was described as an "intelligent footballer", who performed "with infectious exuberance".

Career

Brentford 
Hutchings began his youth career at Chelsea, before signing schoolboy forms with Brentford in 1989. He began an apprenticeship in 1991 and signed a professional contract at the end of the 1992–93 season. He instantly became a regular pick under new manager David Webb and after weathering some early criticism, he went on to become a valuable utility player for the team, filling in over the course of five seasons at full back, centre back and in central midfield. Hutchings was a part of the team that reached the 1995 Second Division play-off semi-finals, but his 1995–96 season was hampered by torn ankle ligaments, suffered in a behind-closed-doors match in August 1995. After making 29 appearances, he was offered a new contract at the end of the season, but rejected it in favour of a month-to-month deal.

Despite being a regular pick early in the 1996–97 season, Hutchings trained with Southend United in September 1996, before agreeing a new two-year contract one month later. Hutchings was part of the team which reached the 1997 Second Division play-off Final and was "the star man" in the disappointing 1–0 defeat. Playing in a poor team, Hutchings had the best season of his career in 1997–98, making 49 appearances and scoring five goals to be voted the club's Supporters' Player of the Year, but the campaign ended with relegation to the Third Division. Out of contract and refusing to discuss an extension, Hutchings departed Brentford in July 1998 and finished his career at Griffin Park with 198 appearances and seven goals.

Bristol City 
On 6 July 1998, Hutchings transferred to First Division club Bristol City for a £135,000 fee. He failed to fully establish himself in the team and by the beginning of the 2000–01 season, he was out of favour with manager Danny Wilson. Hutchings departed Ashton Gate in December 2000, having made 52 appearances and scored five goals during two-and-a-half seasons with the Robins.

Return to Brentford (loan) 
On 11 February 2000, Hutchings returned to Brentford on loan until the end of the 1999–00 season. He made 8 appearances during his spell, but was not offered a contract at the end of the season. Across his two spells with Brentford, Hutchings made 204 appearances and scored seven goals.

Exeter City (loan) 
On 1 December 2000, Hutchings joined Third Division club Exeter City on loan, but lasted just 10 days at St James Park, making three appearances. One month earlier, he had turned down a permanent move to the club.

Southend United 
Hutchings reunited with his former Brentford manager David Webb at Southend United on 29 December 2000 and signed a contract until the end of the 2000–01 season. Despite featuring as a regular, he departed Roots Hall in February 2002, having made 50 appearances and scored five goals.

Leyton Orient 
On 12 February 2002, Hutchings joined Third Division club Leyton Orient on a free transfer. One week later, had a "nightmare" debut at Brisbane Road, when he "fatally sold his goalkeeper short with a backpass", which allowed York City's Alex Mathie to score what proved to be an 84th-minute winner. Hutchings remained with Orient until April 2003, when he was released early from his contract. He made 40 appearances and scored two goals for the club.

Farnborough Town 
Hutchings joined Conference club Farnborough Town on 30 July 2003. He made 22 appearances for the club, the last of which coming in a 2–1 defeat to Exeter City on 3 January 2004.

Personal life
Since retiring from football at the age of 29, Hutchings has become a successful stock market trader, entrepreneur and motivational speaker. He started a property company whilst still a professional footballer, with Bristol City. Hutchings is also involved in sports management.

Honours 
 Brentford Supporters' Player of the Year: 1997–98

Career statistics

References

External links
Official website

1974 births
Living people
English footballers
Chelsea F.C. players
Brentford F.C. players
Bristol City F.C. players
Exeter City F.C. players
Southend United F.C. players
Leyton Orient F.C. players
Farnborough F.C. players
English Football League players
Footballers from Hammersmith
National League (English football) players
Association football utility players
Association football fullbacks
Association football central defenders
Association football midfielders